The sandie, sometimes referred to as sablé, is a type of sugar cookie or shortbread cookie. The pecan sandie is a common variety of the cookie utilizing pecans. The Keebler Company has registered the brand name Sandies, which it uses for a line of shortbread cookies.

Pecans are often used as a main ingredient, and may be crushed and included in the batter, or else placed atop the cookie whole. This pecan cookie is sometimes referred to as a pecan sandie.

Overview
The sandie is a type of sugar cookie or shortbread cookie prepared using standard sugar cookie ingredients such as flour, sugar, butter, eggs, and vanilla. The Keebler Sandie uses soya bean oil and palm oil as a butter substitute. Sandies are sometimes dusted with powdered sugar after cooking.

Commercial production 
The Keebler Company mass-produces and markets Sandies Classic (plain), Pecan, and Cashew shortbread cookies. Keebler first purveyed Sandies cookies in 1955 and added a toffee variety in 1993.

Sablés

The sablé is a popular type of sandie cookie in France; it is said to have originated in Caen, in Normandy, France. "Sablé" means "sanded" in French, and is so named because of its crumbly and fine texture.

Pecan sandies gallery

See also

 Corn cookie
 List of cookies
 List of shortbread biscuits and cookies
 Snickerdoodle
 Teacake
 Russian tea cake

References

Cookies